The Brief is a British crime drama series first broadcast on ITV on 24 April 2004. The series follows the work of defence barrister Henry Farmer (Alan Davies), whose complicated personal life manages to overlap into his work. Other stars in the series include Linda Bassett, Christopher Fulford and Cherie Lunghi. After critical acclaim and strong viewing figures for the first series of four episodes, a second series was commissioned, which began transmission on 7 October 2005.

However, the second series did not achieve the same viewing figures as the first; and following rumblings of the possible return of Jonathan Creek, Davies quit the role and a third series was not commissioned. However, both series were subsequently released in a double DVD box set on 27 April 2009, and were digitally released via the ITV store on 14 February 2016.

Plot
The Brief follows the work of defence barrister Henry Farmer (Alan Davies), whose complicated personal life manages to overlap into his work. With an overbearing workload, debt and alimony payments to meet, as well as being in love with the wife of a prominent politician who won't leave her husband for him, Henry is forced to set his own demons to one side to tackle cases that only he can win. The show was described by the Radio Times as an "engaging blend of courtroom drama, suspense, intrigue and humour".

Cast
 Alan Davies as Henry Farmer QC
 Steven Alvey as Paul Bracewell
 Linda Bassett as Maureen Tyler
 Christopher Fulford as Ray Scanlon
 Cherie Lunghi as Cleo Steyn
 Edward Petherbridge as Gillespie
 Robert Whitelock as Ben Halliwell

Episode list

Series 1 (2004)

Series 2 (2005)

References

External links
 

2000s British crime drama television series
2000s British legal television series
2004 British television series debuts
2005 British television series endings
English-language television shows
ITV television dramas
Serial drama television series
Television shows set in London